The pink-rumped rosefinch (Carpodacus waltoni) is a species of finch in the family Fringillidae.

It is found in central China and eastern Tibet. Its natural habitat is temperate grassland. Its most peculiar characteristic is the pink colour of its wings.

References

pink-rumped rosefinch
Birds of Tibet
Birds of Central China
pink-rumped rosefinch
Taxonomy articles created by Polbot